Wang Zuo'an (born May 1958) is a Chinese politician who served as director of the State Administration for Religious Affairs and vice-minister of the United Front Work Department from 2009 to 2022.

He was an alternate member of the 18th Central Committee of the Chinese Communist Party. He was a member of the 12th and 13th Standing Committee of the Chinese People's Political Consultative Conference.

Biography
Wang was born in Yixing, Jiangsu, in May 1958. He entered the workforce in September 1977, and joined the Chinese Communist Party in June 1985. After the Cultural Revolution in 1977, he worked in a ceramic factory in his hometown. After the resumption of College Entrance Examination, he entered the Nanjing University, where he majored in philosophy.

After university, he was assigned to the United Front Work Department, where he worked until 1987. In August 1987 he was transferred to the State Administration for Religious Affairs and over a period of 30 years worked his way up to the position of Director. He concurrently serving as vice-minister of the United Front Work Department since March 2018.

References

External links

1958 births
Nanjing University alumni
Living people
People's Republic of China politicians from Jiangsu
Chinese Communist Party politicians from Jiangsu
Alternate members of the 18th Central Committee of the Chinese Communist Party
People from Yixing
Politicians from Wuxi